Adam Craig Sherlip (born March 21, 1984) is the first head coach of the India men's national ice hockey team, which competed in the IIHF Challenge Cup of Asia, hosted by Abu Dhabi, UAE, in 2009  and in Dehradun, India in 2012, the location of India's first ice arena. It was in the 2012 tournament, with Sherlip as coach, that India won its first international ice hockey game. He started coaching ice hockey in India as part of an initiative he started, called "The Hockey Volunteer".

Sherlip discovered hockey in India while coaching in China. As a result of "The Hockey Volunteer" initiative, Sherlip founded The Hockey Foundation, a non-profit that uses ice hockey to help improve life in the communities. The Hockey Foundation's pilot program operates in Ladakh, in the Indian state of Jammu and Kashmir. The Hockey Foundation has donated over 4,000 pieces equipment since 2009. Sherlip and The Hockey Foundation are the subject of the documentary "Disputed Ice," which is currently in development.

Sherlip previously worked for the New York Islanders, and coached hockey at the City Ice Pavilion in Long Island City.

References

1984 births
Living people
Ice hockey in India
American ice hockey coaches